Polytminae is one of the six subfamilies of the hummingbird family Trochilidae. The subfamily contains 12 genera with a total of 29 species.

The informal name "mangoes" has been proposed for this group as the seven species in the largest genus, Anthracothorax, include "mango" in their common name.

Taxonomy
A molecular phylogenetic study of the hummingbirds published in 2007 found that the family consisted of nine clades. When Edward Dickinson and James Van Remsen, Jr. updated the Howard and Moore Complete Checklist of the Birds of the World for the 4th edition in 2013 they divided the nine clades into six subfamilies and proposed using the Latin name Polytminae for the "mango" clade, a name that had been introduced by Ludwig Reichenbach in 1849.

The existence of this clade was not anticipated by pre-molecular studies but a common feature is the presence of serrations on the cutting edge of the bill. An extreme example is the tooth-billed hummingbird (Androdon aequatorialis).

Molecular phylogenetic studies by Jimmy McGuire and collaborators published between 2007 and 2014 determined the relationships between the major groups of hummingbirds. In the cladogram below the English names are those introduced in 1997. The Latin names are those proposed by Dickinson and Remsen in 2013.

The phylogenetic relationships between the genera in the subfamily Polytminae as determined in the 2014 study are shown below. The genus Eulampis was found to be nested within Anthracothorax  making Anthracothorax paraphyletic. No species from the genus Augastes was sampled in the molecular studies but based on a comparison of plumage features and bill shapes it is believed that Augastes is closely related to Schistes.

Taxonomic list
The subfamily includes the following twelve genera:

References

Sources

 

Bird subfamilies